Hans Sloane (14 November 1739 – 1827), later called Hans Sloane-Stanley, was a politician who sat in the House of Commons between 1768 and 1806.

Early life
Hans Sloane was born on 14 November 1739 at South Stoneham, Hampshire. He was educated at Newcome's School, Trinity College, Cambridge and the Inner Temple. He was the great-nephew of noted physician and collector Sir Hans Sloane, Bart., and first cousin of John 'Mad Jack' Fuller, who was also a Member of Parliament for Southampton in 1780. Another relative was Hans Stanley, grandson of Sir Hans Sloane, who guided his early career.

Career
Stanley was influential in the Isle of Wight, and found Sloane a parliamentary seat there, having him elected as Member of Parliament for Newport (Isle of Wight) in 1768. From 1770 to 1782, he was also Stanley's deputy as Cofferer of the Household.

Sloane was later also MP for Southampton from 1780 to 1784, Christchurch from 1788 to 1796 and Lostwithiel, Cornwall, from 1796 to 1802, and a junior Lord of Trade from 1780 to 1782 (when he lost office with the fall of Lord North's government).

Personal life
On 24 June 1772, Sloane married Sarah Fuller, the daughter of Stephen Fuller and Elizabeth Noakes. They had five sons and two daughters. On the death of Hans Stanley in 1780, Sloane had inherited his estate of Paultons near Romsey, subject to the life interest of Stanley's two sisters, and in recognition of this he adopted the additional surname of Stanley in 1821.

Death and legacy
Sloane died in 1827. There is a memorial to Sarah in South Stoneham church.

References

 Lewis Namier & John Brooke, The History of Parliament: The House of Commons 1754–1790 (London: HMSO, 1964)
 

1739 births
1827 deaths
Members of Parliament for the Isle of Wight
Members of the Parliament of Great Britain for Lostwithiel
Members of the Parliament of the United Kingdom for Lostwithiel
British MPs 1768–1774
British MPs 1774–1780
British MPs 1780–1784
British MPs 1784–1790
British MPs 1790–1796
British MPs 1796–1800
UK MPs 1801–1802
UK MPs 1802–1806
Alumni of Trinity College, Cambridge
Members of the Inner Temple
People educated at Newcome's School
Members of Parliament for Newport (Isle of Wight)
People from South Stoneham